The 2009–10 Taça da Liga was the third edition of the Taça da Liga, also known as Carlsberg Cup for sponsorship reasons. The first matches were played on 1 August 2009. The final was played on 21 March 2009, with Benfica defeating Porto 3–0 to win their second Taça da Liga. The final was played at the Estádio Algarve, Faro.

Format
The 2009–10 Taça de Liga began with a two-legged round between teams from Liga de Honra, the second level of Portuguese football. Winners join the clubs classified 7th–14th from the previous season's Primeira Liga (first level) plus two promoted to the 2009–10 Primeira Liga. There were six groups of three teams each, and every team play two games (once home and once away). Winners of the groups joined the top six teams from the previous season's Primeira Liga in three groups of four teams, each team playing three matches. Winners of the groups and the best second-placed team competed in the one-legged semifinals, with the winners advancing to the final.

Participating clubs
This is a list of clubs participating in the 2009–10 Portuguese League Cup:
 Clubs starting from the First Round: Gil Vicente, Beira-Mar, Estoril, Desportivo das Aves, Varzim, Santa Clara, Portimonense, Freamunde, Feirense, Oliveirense, Covilhã, Trofense, Fátima, Chaves, Carregado, Penafiel
 Clubs starting from the Second Round: Belenenses, Naval, Académica, Paços de Ferreira, Rio Ave, União de Leiria, Olhanense, Vitória de Guimarães, Vitória de Setúbal, Marítimo
 Clubs starting from the Third Round: Porto, Sporting CP, Benfica, Nacional, Leixões, Braga

Boavista was first included in the draw, but the club was excluded from professional competitions on 13 July 2009 due to financial debts. Boavista was scheduled to play against Sporting da Covilhã. On the following day, Penafiel and Carregado were invited to the professional leagues and, after both accepting, they officially joined the league on July 28.

First round
The matches will be played on August 1 and 2 (first legs) and August 8 and 9, 2009 (second legs).

Second round

Group A

Group B

Group C

Group D

Group E

Group F

Third round

Group A

Académica qualified as best runner-up of all groups.

All times: UTC+0

Group B

All times: UTC+0

Group C

All times: UTC+0

Knockout phase

Semi-finals

Final

References

External links
Official site
Official regulation 
Official Statistics 

2009-10
2009–10 European domestic association football cups
2009–10 in Portuguese football